Lowton Church of England High School is a coeducational secondary school located in Lowton in the English county of Greater Manchester.

It is a foundation school administered by Wigan Metropolitan Borough Council. The school became affiliated with the Church of England in 2012 under the guidance of the Diocese of Liverpool. The school educates pupils mainly from Lowton, Golborne, Leigh and Atherton.

Lowton Church of England High School offers GCSEs and some entry level courses as programmes of study for pupils. The school also offers evening adult education and sports facilities to the local community.

Between September 2005 and August 2017, Lowton Church of England High School has been ranked consistently less than good during at least four full inspections by Ofsted.

Notable former pupils
Lemn Sissay, poet
Sarah Jayne Dunn, actress
Katie White, musician
Heather Frederiksen, Paralympic Games gold medalist
 Jon Clarke Professional Rugby League player
David Morris, Member of Parliament for Morecambe
James Grundy, Member of Parliament for Leigh

References

External links
Lowton Church of England High School official website

Secondary schools in the Metropolitan Borough of Wigan
Foundation schools in the Metropolitan Borough of Wigan
Church of England secondary schools in the Diocese of Liverpool